Fleming Lynge (20 September 1896 – 3 November 1970) was a Danish screenwriter. He wrote for more than 70 films between 1929 and 1959. He was born and died in Denmark.

Selected filmography
 Vi arme syndere (1952)
 Besættelse (1944)
 Melody of Murder (1944)
 Jeg har elsket og levet (1940)
 Familien Olsen (1940)
 Circus (1939)
 Life on the Hegn Farm (1938)
 Champagnegaloppen (1938)
 65, 66 and I (1936)
Prisoner Number One (1935)
 Nøddebo Præstegård (1934)
 De blaa drenge (1933)
 Lalla vinner! (1932)
 Odds 777 (1932)
 Skal vi vædde en million? (1932)
 Hotel Paradis (1931)
 Præsten i Vejlby (1931)

External links

1896 births
1970 deaths
Danish male screenwriters
20th-century screenwriters
People from Frederiksberg